Aziz Eraltay Behich (born 16 December 1990) is an Australian professional footballer who plays as a left back and left winger for Scottish club Dundee United and the Australia national team.

Club career

Youth career
Behich played in the junior divisions of Green Gully SC. He participated in the junior leagues of Melbourne's North-West. He had played for the club's Reserve team in 2007. In February 2007 Behich had returned to Australia after having been training at the David Beckham Academy. In 2008 Behich was signed to the club's first team, surprisingly because the coach; Ian Dobson, had preferred experienced players within his squad, where he made his debut on 22 February 2008 in a 2–0 loss against Richmond. He had been substituted onto the field in the 57th minute. He had been promoted to the club's first team with teammate Diogo Ferreira, who also went on to sign for Melbourne during Behich's second youth season.
In 2008, Behich scored 2 goals in 11 appearances while playing for Green Gully in Australia's Second Division. He had scored his two goals in a 6–1 win against Fawkner Blues on 17 May 2008, he had been substituted onto the field in the 76th minute and scored in both the 84th and 86th minutes.

Prior to the start of the 2008–2009 A-League's National Youth League, Behich was selected for Melbourne Victory's squad. On 3 January 2009, Aziz scored in a 3–0 win against Queensland Roar. One week later, he scored again in a 2–0 win against Perth Glory on 10 January 2009. Victory went on to finish in 6th position out of 7 teams.

During the National Youth League's off-season, Behich would return to play for Green Gully in the 2009 season. Aziz had appeared 22 times for Green Gully, once in the final's play-offs, and had scored 2 goals overall. His second goal came in a play-off match against Altona Magic where which Behich was substituted onto the field in the 80th minute when Green Gully were trailing 3–2. Behich had scored an equaliser in the 94th minute to take the game to extra-time, however, Green Gully eventually lost 4–3 on penalties

The following season, Behich was the only youth player to re-sign with Melbourne's youth team and was handed the captain's arm band.

Melbourne Victory
Behich made his debut for Melbourne Victory's first team on 16 January 2010, in the 2009–10 A-League season, where he was substituted on to the field in the 83rd minute for Carlos Hernández in a 6–2 win against Perth Glory. His second appearance was on 23 January 2010, where he was substituted onto the field in the 91st minute, again for Carlos Hernández, in a 2–0 win against Adelaide United. Despite Matthew Theodore being the only player to sign from Melbourne's youth-team to its first team in 2009, as of 2010 Behich was the only youth player to gain a first-team appearance and consecutive first-team appearances. It was then announced, in January 2010, that Behich was named in Melbourne's 2010 AFC Champions League squad. He was substituted on during the second half of the 2009–2010 A-League Grand Final when Melbourne lost on penalties to Sydney, and is notable for the narrowest miss of the match, which could have been the winner. Behich then signed to Hume City in the Victorian Premier League during the A-League off-season.

Hume City
Behich debuted for Hume City in a 2–2 draw against Northcote City on 16 May 2010. Scoring on debut, he netted Hume city's second goal on 81 minutes. He appeared 5 more times for the side, departing from the club in June, as they finished in second spot of the Victorian Premier League table.

Melbourne Heart
By July 2010, he trialled with the Melbourne Heart squad where he took part in a round of warm up matches that the club played, including a 2–0 defeat against Everton. Behich, shortly after trialling with Melbourne Heart, signed a 7-week deal with the club as an injury replacement player for Kristian Sarkies until October 2010. After Dean Heffernan received a red card, Behich slotted into the starting lineup to cover his position, and started most games afterwards. On 25 October 2010, he signed a full-time contract with the Melbourne Heart, becoming the first player to play for both Melbourne Victory and Melbourne Heart. At Heart, he was developed into more of a defensive player, a left back or left winger, as opposed to the striker position he played at Victory. He was the first player to be sent off in a Melbourne derby, given his second yellow in the very first encounter between the clubs, which Heart won 2–1. In January, Behich was awarded the A-League Young Footballer of the month. It was reported on 28 January 2012 by the Dutch media that Behich had attracted the interest of Eredivisie club Excelsior and 2. Bundesliga sides VfL Bochum and Eintracht Frankfurt. Excelsior manager John Lammers spoke of his interest in the exciting youngster to Rotterdam newspapers Algemeen Dagblad and NRC Handelsblad: "We are looking to bring Aziz to the club, he's an exceptional talent who we've been watching."

Bursaspor
On 29 January 2013, Behich signed to Turkish Süper Lig club Bursaspor. On 11 March 2013, Aziz Behich made his Turkish Süper Lig debut for Bursaspor against Fenerbahçe as a 69th-minute substitute for Tuncay. On 4 March 2016, Behich signed three-year extension to his contract with Bursaspor, which was due to expire in May.

PSV Eindhoven
On 31 August 2018, Behich signed for Eredivisie club PSV Eindhoven for four years. The transfer fee paid to Bursaspor was reported as for $4.5 million

İstanbul Başakşehir
On 24 May 2019, it was announced Behich would return to Turkey to join İstanbul Başakşehir for the 2019–20 season, having agreed a three-year deal.

Kayserispor (loan)
On 2 October 2020, Behich joined Kayserispor on a season-long loan.

Giresunspor 
On 26 August 2021, Behich joined recently promoted sided Giresunspor, in their return to the Süper Lig.

Dundee United 

On 28 July 2022, Behich joined Dundee United on a free transfer, signing a two-year contract.

International career

Behich was called up to the Australia Under-23 side by coach Aurelio Vidmar for a friendly match against Japan's Under-23 side at the Tohoku Denryoku Bigswan Stadium, Niigata on Wednesday 1 June 2011. Behich was selected to play against Yemen's under-23 side for the Football at the 2012 Summer Olympics – Men's Asian Qualifiers Preliminary Round 2. On 14 June 2011, in preparation for the 2012 AFC Men's Pre-Olympic Tournament, Behich featured in a 6–0 win against Singapore under-23 where he scored Australia's sixth goal in the 90th minute. On 19 June 2011 Behich played in Australia's first-leg 3–0 win against Yemen. Four days later he played in the second leg which resulted in a 4–0 win to Australia on 23 June.

Behich was called up to the Australian national team by Holger Osieck for a friendly match against South Korea on 14 November 2012, where he made his debut.

In May 2018 he was named in Australia's 23-man squad for the 2018 World Cup in Russia.

Personal life
Behich is a Muslim of Turkish Cypriot origin, son of immigrants to Australia from Cyprus.
For this reason he was eligible to represent Turkey, Cyprus or Australia, eventually choosing the last.

Career statistics

Club

International

Scores and results list Australia's goal tally first, score column indicates score after each Behich goal.

Honours
Green Gully
Victorian Premier League Premiers: 2008

İstanbul Başakşehir
Süper Lig: 2019–20

Australia
AFC Asian Cup: 2015

Individual
PFA A-League Team of the Season: 2011–12

References

External links

FFA Olyroos Profile
Aziz Behich Official Website

1990 births
Living people
Australian people of Turkish descent
Australian people of Turkish Cypriot descent
Sportspeople of Turkish Cypriot descent
Soccer players from Melbourne
Australian soccer players
Association football defenders
Association football midfielders
Green Gully SC players
Melbourne Victory FC players
Melbourne City FC players
Bursaspor footballers
Hume City FC players
PSV Eindhoven players
İstanbul Başakşehir F.K. players
Kayserispor footballers
Dundee United F.C. players
A-League Men players
Süper Lig players
Eredivisie players
Scottish Professional Football League players
Australia youth international soccer players
Australia international soccer players
2015 AFC Asian Cup players
2017 FIFA Confederations Cup players
2018 FIFA World Cup players
2019 AFC Asian Cup players
2022 FIFA World Cup players
AFC Asian Cup-winning players
Australian expatriate soccer players
Australian expatriate sportspeople in Turkey
Australian expatriate sportspeople in the Netherlands
Australian expatriate sportspeople in Scotland
Expatriate footballers in Turkey
Expatriate footballers in the Netherlands
Expatriate footballers in Scotland
Australian Muslims